Gabriela M. Mosquera (born January 3, 1977) is an American Democratic Party politician, who has represented the 4th Legislative District in the New Jersey General Assembly since taking office on March 5, 2012.

Early life 
Mosquera was born on January 3, 1977, in Guayaquil, Ecuador. She immigrated to the United States at the age of three. Mosquera received a B.A. degree from The College of New Jersey, where she majored in political science and was awarded an M.B.A. from the Keller Graduate School of Management at Devry University. After college, she worked as a policy analyst for the Assembly Democratic Caucus and later as an assistant to 5th District Assemblywoman Nilsa Cruz-Perez. She is currently the chief of staff to Gloucester Township mayor David R. Mayer. She has lived in the Blackwood section of Gloucester Township since 2011.

New Jersey Assembly 
Due to the 2011 apportionment based on the results of the 2010 United States census, the 4th District Assembly seat of Domenick DiCicco, a Republican, became vacant, with DiCicco placed in the 3rd District where he lost to the Democratic incumbents. Mosquera ran for the vacant seat on the Democratic ticket with the incumbent Paul D. Moriarty. In the general election, she and Moriarty defeated the Republican candidates, former Gloucester Township councilwoman Shelley Lovett and Patricia Fratticcioli. By taking DiCicco's seat, Mosquera represented the only gain by the Democrats in the Assembly in the 2011 election cycle. In response to a lawsuit filed by Lovett, Mosquera could not be sworn into office in January 2012 and a ruling issued the next month by the New Jersey Supreme Court declared Mosquera's November 2011 win invalid, saying that her move to the Gloucester Township did not meet the one-year residency requirement established in state law. Mosquera was sworn into office on March 5 after she was selected by district Democrats and filed to face off again against Lovett in a November 2012 special election. In June 2012, the United States District Court for the District of New Jersey overturned the N.J. Supreme Court ruling and upheld her November 2011 election, finding that an injunction that prohibits enforcement of the one-year residency rule is in force in years in which redistricting takes place. Mosquera won the November 2012 special election for the remainder of the term, defeating Lovett by a margin of 60 to 40 percent.

Committees 
Committee assignments for the current session are:
Women and Children, Chair
Appropriations

District 4 
Each of the 40 districts in the New Jersey Legislature has one representative in the New Jersey Senate and two members in the New Jersey General Assembly.Each of the 40 districts in the New Jersey Legislature has one representative in the New Jersey Senate and two members in the New Jersey General Assembly. The representatives from the 4th District for the 2022—2023 Legislative Session are:
Senator Fred H. Madden (D),
Assemblyman Paul D. Moriarty (D)
Assemblywoman Gabriela Mosquera (D)

Electoral history

Assembly

References

External links
Assemblywoman Mosquera's legislative web page, New Jersey Legislature
New Jersey Legislature financial disclosure forms - 2012  2011

1977 births
Living people
DeVry University alumni
Hispanic and Latino American state legislators in New Jersey
Hispanic and Latino American women in politics
Democratic Party members of the New Jersey General Assembly
People from Gloucester Township, New Jersey
Politicians from Camden County, New Jersey
The College of New Jersey alumni
Women state legislators in New Jersey
American politicians of Ecuadorian descent
Ecuadorian emigrants to the United States
21st-century American politicians
21st-century American women politicians